Diana is a 1637 painting of Diana by Simon Vouet. It was produced in Paris and sent to England as part of the dowry of Louis XIII's sister Henrietta Maria of France on her marriage to Charles I of England. It is still in the Royal Collection and now hangs in the Cumberland Gallery at Hampton Court Palace.

Sources
https://web.archive.org/web/20120204082319/http://www.artehistoria.jcyl.es/genios/cuadros/5291.htm
https://www.royalcollection.org.uk/collection/403930/diana

Paintings depicting Diana (mythology)
1637 paintings
Paintings in the Royal Collection of the United Kingdom
Paintings by Simon Vouet
Henrietta Maria